Pseudaraeococcus is a genus of flowering plant in the family Bromeliaceae, native to northeastern Brazil. It was first described as the subgenus Pseudaraeococcus of the genus Araeococcus by Carl Christian Mez in 1935, and raised to a separate genus in 2020.

Species
, Plants of the World Online accepted the following species:
Pseudaraeococcus chlorocarpus (Wawra) R.A.Pontes & Versieux
Pseudaraeococcus lageniformis (R.A.Pontes & Versieux) R.A.Pontes & Versieux
Pseudaraeococcus montanus (Leme) R.A.Pontes & Versieux
Pseudaraeococcus nigropurpureus (Leme & J.A.Siqueira) R.A.Pontes & Versieux
Pseudaraeococcus parviflorus (Mart. ex Schult. & Schult.f.) R.A.Pontes & Versieux
Pseudaraeococcus sessiliflorus (Leme & J.A.Siqueira) R.A.Pontes & Versieux

References

Bromelioideae
Bromeliaceae genera